Michael George Watt (born 27 November 1970 in Aberdeen) is a former professional footballer. He was a goalkeeper who played for Aberdeen, Norwich City and Kilmarnock.

Watt began his career with Aberdeen, where he was capped 13 times by Scotland under-21s. He was released by the club in 1998, subsequently signing a contract with Norwich City that would see him stay at Carrow Road until the end of the season. When his contract expired in the summer of 1999, he returned to Scotland to play for Kilmarnock, leaving in December 1999.

Following his departure from football, Watt has been working as a financial adviser in Glasgow.

Honours
Aberdeen
Scottish League Cup: 1
 1995–96

References

External links
 

Career information at ex-canaries.co.uk

Footballers from Aberdeen
Scottish footballers
Aberdeen F.C. players
Norwich City F.C. players
Kilmarnock F.C. players
Scottish Football League players
English Football League players
Scottish Premier League players
Scotland under-21 international footballers
1970 births
Living people
Association football goalkeepers
Blackburn Rovers F.C. players
Cove Rangers F.C. players
Scotland B international footballers